Østprøven was a village in Greenland, now abandoned.

Former populated places in Greenland